Kim Joo-sung (born 17 January 1966) is a former South Korean football player. Kim is regarded as one of the greatest Asian footballers of the 20th century. He was nominated for the IFFHS Asia's Player of the Century, finishing second place.

Club career 
Kim joined Daewoo Royals in 1987. In his first professional season, he won the K League and was named the K League Young Player of the Year.

In June 1992, Kim was loaned to a Bundesliga club VfL Bochum. He struggled with competing in the big league, and Bochum was also relegated to the 2. Bundesliga after the 1992–93 season. He tried to return to the Bundesliga, helping Bochum to win the 2. Bundesliga in the 1993–94 season. However, he came back to South Korea at the request of Daewoo Royals.

Originally deployed as a winger or an attacking midfielder, Kim played as a sweeper after the 1994 FIFA World Cup because the condition of his knee was exacerbated. In the 1997 season, Daewoo Royals once again won the K League with his successful change, and he received the K League MVP Award. Kim announced his retirement in 1999, and his uniform number 16 was also retired by Daewoo.

International career 
Kim was selected for the South Korea national team for the 1986 FIFA World Cup, playing in a major competition for the first time. He also played for South Korea in the 1986 Asian Games, winning a gold medal.

Afterwards, Kim became the greatest footballer in Asia and South Korea. In the 1988 AFC Asian Cup, he performed a key role with great dribbles, leading South Korea to the final. He became the Most Valuable Player of the tournament, although South Korea lost to Saudi Arabia after the penalty shoot-out in the final. He was also named the Most Outstanding Player in the Asian qualification of the 1990 FIFA World Cup after South Korea won the competition without a defeat. He was voted Asian Footballer of the Year for three consecutive years from 1989 to 1991.

Kim's domination over Asia interested European clubs at the time. However, he showed poor performance in the 1990 FIFA World Cup, failing to live up to their expectations. He could go to Europe two years after the end of the World Cup.

Style of play 
He was nicknamed the "Wild Horse" or the "Samson" due to his pace and long curly hair. He normally played as a winger, but he was capable of playing as an attacking midfielder or a sweeper.

After retirement 
In September 2003 he attended a sports management masters course at De Montfort University, Leicester until February 2004 when his studies took him to Switzerland.

Career statistics

Club

International 
 
Results list South Korea's goal tally first.

Honours 
Busan Daewoo Royals
K League 1: 1987, 1991, 1997
Korean National Championship: 1989
Korean League Cup: 1997, 1997+, 1998+

VfL Bochum
2. Bundesliga: 1993–94

South Korea B
Summer Universiade silver medal: 1987

South Korea
Asian Games: 1986
AFC Asian Cup runner-up: 1988
Dynasty Cup: 1990

Individual
World XI: 1991
AFC Asian Cup Most Valuable Player: 1988
AFC Asian Cup Team of the Tournament: 1988
FIFA World Cup qualification (AFC) Most Outstanding Player: 1990
IFFHS Asian Player of the Year: 1989, 1990, 1991
IFFHS Asia's Player of the Century runner-up: 1900–1999
IFFHS Asian Men's Team of the Century: 1901–2000
Asian/Oceanian Team of the 20th Century: 1998
Dynasty Cup Most Valuable Player: 1990
Korean FA Best XI: 1985, 1986, 1987, 1988
Korean FA Player of the Year: 1991
K League Rookie of the Year: 1987
K League 1 Best XI: 1987, 1991, 1996, 1997, 1999
K League 1 Most Valuable Player: 1997
K League 30th Anniversary Best XI: 2013

References

External links
 
 
 

 

1966 births
Living people
Busan IPark players
VfL Bochum players
Bundesliga players
2. Bundesliga players
K League 1 Most Valuable Player Award winners
K League 1 players
1996 AFC Asian Cup players
1994 FIFA World Cup players
1990 FIFA World Cup players
1988 AFC Asian Cup players
Footballers at the 1988 Summer Olympics
1986 FIFA World Cup players
Olympic footballers of South Korea
Association football midfielders
Expatriate footballers in Germany
South Korean expatriate sportspeople in Germany
South Korean expatriate footballers
South Korea international footballers
South Korean footballers
Alumni of De Montfort University
Asian Footballer of the Year winners
South Korean expatriate sportspeople in Switzerland
South Korean expatriate sportspeople in the United Kingdom
Asian Games medalists in football
Footballers at the 1986 Asian Games
Footballers at the 1990 Asian Games
Asian Games gold medalists for South Korea
Asian Games bronze medalists for South Korea
Medalists at the 1986 Asian Games
Medalists at the 1990 Asian Games
Universiade medalists in football
Universiade silver medalists for South Korea
Sportspeople from Gangwon Province, South Korea